In aviation, a multiplane is a fixed-wing aircraft-configuration featuring multiple wing planes. The wing planes may be stacked one above another, or one behind another, or both in combination.
Types having a small number of planes have specific names and are not usually described as multiplanes:

 Biplane - two wings stacked one above the other
 Triplane - three wings stacked one above another
 Tandem wing - two main planes, one behind the other. The tandem triple or tandem triplet configuration has three lifting surfaces one behind another.

While triplane, quadruplane and tandem designs are relatively uncommon, aircraft with more than four sets of wings rarely occur - none have proven successful.

Quadruplanes

The quadruplane configuration takes the triplane approach a step further, using efficient wings of high aspect ratio and stacking them to allow a compact and light weight design. During the pioneer years of aviation and World War I, a few designers sought these potential benefits for a variety of reasons, mostly with little success.

From ca. 1909 the American inventor Matthew Bacon Sellers II made a series of flights in the Sellers 1909 Quadruplane, progressively fitted with powerplants of decreasing power, in order to investigate low-powered flight. He eventually achieved flight on only 5 to 6 hp at a speed of 20 mph.

Pemberton-Billing Ltd. made two prototype Zeppelin killers, the Pemberton-Billing P.B.29E and Pemberton-Billing P.B.31E, respectively in 1915 and 1917. They were comparatively large, twin-engined fighters. After the company changed its name to Supermarine, the P.B.31E became known as the Supermarine Nighthawk.

Following test flights with the prototype Armstrong Whitworth F.K.9 in 1916, a small number of Armstrong Whitworth F.K.10 quadruplane reconnaissance fighters were produced, but none saw combat action.

The private-venture Wight Quadruplane scout fighter was flown in 1917.

The Euler Vierdecker of 1917 unusually featured a standard triplane arrangement of fixed wings with a fourth uppermost wing comprising left and right hand articulated surfaces which acted as full-span ailerons. Two examples were built, with different engines.

Also in 1917, Friedrichshafen created the even more unusual Friedrichshafen FF54 scout fighter, which featured narrow-chord second and third wings, with struts connecting only the upper pair and lower pair of planes. The prototype proved unacceptable in the air and was later modified as an equally unsuccessful triplane, again with a short-chord intermediate plane.

The Naglo D.II quadruplane fighter of 1918 featured a standard triplane arrangement with a smaller fourth wing attached below the main assembly, somewhat analogous to a sesquiplane. It participated in Germany's second D-type contest in 1918, and was praised for its construction and workmanship.

In 1922 Besson constructed the H-5, a prototype quadruplane flying boat transport. It was unusual in having two braced biplane wing stacks deeply staggered and vertically offset such that the four wing planes were stacked in an overall zig-zag arrangement. The only example was damaged and development was abandoned.

More than four planes

Any fixed-wing aircraft with more than four wing planes may be referred to as a multiplane. Planes may be stacked vertically as with a biplane, or placed one in front of another as with a tandem wing. Both principles may be combined.

Stacked multiplanes

In the 1890s Hiram Maxim constructed a steam-powered flying machine which he ran on rails as a test rig. It began as a biplane and later more lifting and control surfaces were added to create a bizarre multiplane. On one occasion the lift force was so great that the rail was damaged. Maxim did not allow the rig to take off because it had no effective controls.

Horatio Phillips built a series of multiplane types from 1904. His Phillips Multiplane I had 20 stacked wings in an otherwise fairly conventional layout. It proved too unstable for sustained flight. By 1907 his third model was able to fly 500 ft, achieving the first successful powered flight in Great Britain. However the disappointing performance compared to more conventional contemporary types caused Phillips to abandon his ideas.

In 1908 Roshon in America and D'Equevilly in France produced typical multiplane designs. The AEA Cygnet II, designed by Alexander Graham Bell and constructed by the Aerial Experimental Association in America, featured a cellular multiplane formed by hundreds of tetrahedral shapes. Neither of these was capable of flight.

One of the most infamous multiplanes was the 1923 Gerhardt Cycleplane, a human-powered aircraft with seven sets of wings which made a single short hop under human power alone.  Its flimsy construction and subsequent collapse was filmed, and this is often used as stock footage mocking early impractical aircraft designs.

Tandem multiplanes
The American Williams 1908 Multiplane featured four planes in tandem while the Zerbe Sextuplane of 1908 had six. The same year, in Switzerland the Dufaux 1908 Tandem Triplane provided the country's first native design in the form of a tandem pair of stacked triplane wings with a smaller biplane horizontal stabiliser.

Stacks in tandem
Anthony Fokker designed his bizarre Fokker V.8 about the same time as his famous Fokker Dr.I triplane. It featured a tandem arrangement of five wing planes, grouped as a stacked triplane fore wing and a biplane rear wing. Unlike its successful cousin, it barely flew and was soon abandoned.

As late as 1921, the Italian Gianni Caproni mated three stacks of triplane wings from his Caproni Ca.4 series to a single fuselage in tandem triple arrangement, to create the nine-winged Caproni Ca.60 Noviplano prototype long-range airliner. It proved unstable and crashed on its first flight.

List of multiplane aircraft
This list includes types having four or more wing planes.

|-
| Maxim Flying machine || UK || 2 to 7 planes || Experimental || 1890s || Test rig || 0 || Planes mostly stacked. Various configurations investigated. Held down on rails, it lifted but was never allowed to fly free.
|-
| Phillips test rig || UK || 41 planes || Experimental || 1893 || Test rig || 0 || Stacked planes. Tethered to rails, lifted 3 ft.
|-
| Phillips Multiplane I || UK || 20 planes || Experimental || 1904 || Prototype || 1 || Stacked planes. Hops but too unstable for sustained flight.
|-
| Phillips Multiplane II || UK || 200 planes || Experimental || 1907 || Prototype || 1 || 4 tandem stacks of 50 planes each. First successful powered flight in Great Britain.
|-
| Williams 1908 Multiplane || US || 4 planes || Experimental || 1908 || Prototype || 1 || Tandem planes.
|-
| Zerbe Sextuplane || US || 6 planes || Experimental || 1908 || Prototype || 1 || Tandem planes.
|-
| Dufaux triplane || Switzerland || 8 planes || Experimental || 1908 || Prototype || 1 || Tandem pair of stacked triplane wings with a smaller biplane horizontal stabiliser. First Swiss aircraft. Failed to fly.
|-
| Roshon multiplane || US || 26 planes || Experimental || 1908 || Prototype || 1 || Tandem stacks of 13. Failed to fly.
|-
| D'Equevilly multiplane || France || 7 planes || Experimental || 1908 || Prototype || 1 || Failed to fly.
|-
| AEA Cygnet II || US || 16 planes || Experimental || 1908 || Prototype || 1 || Planes of repeat tetrahedral form, stacked. Cellular multiplane designed by Alexander Graham Bell. Failed to fly.
|-
| Sellers 1909 Quadruplane || US || 4 planes || Experimental || 1909 || Prototype || 1 || Investigation of low-powered flight.
|-
| Pemberton-Billing P.B.29E || UK || 4 planes || Fighter || 1915 || Prototype ||  || Zeppelin killer.
|-
| Armstrong Whitworth F.K.9 || UK || 4 planes || Reconnaissance fighter || 1916 || Prototype ||  || 
|-
| Armstrong Whitworth F.K.10 || UK || 4 planes || Reconnaissance fighter || 1917 || Production ||  || 
|-
| Pemberton-Billing P.B.31E || UK || 4 planes || Fighter || 1917 || Prototype ||  || Zeppelin killer. Became the Supermarine Nighthawk.
|-
| Supermarine Nighthawk || UK || 4 planes || Fighter || 1917 || Prototype ||  || Zeppelin killer. Previously the Pemberton-Billing P.B.31E.
|-
| Wight quadruplane || UK || 4 planes || Fighter || 1917 || Prototype || 1 || 
|-
| Euler Vierdecker || Germany || 4 planes || Fighter || 1917 || Prototype || 2 || Standard triplane arrangement of fixed wings with a fourth uppermost wing comprising left and right hand articulated surfaces which acted as full-span ailerons.
|-
| Friedrichshafen FF54 || Germany || 4 planes || Fighter || 1917 || Prototype ||  || Narrow-chord second and third wings, with struts connecting only the upper pair and lower pair of planes. Later modified to triplane configuration.
|-
| Naglo D.II || Germany || 4 planes || Fighter || 1918 || Prototype ||  || Standard triplane arrangement with a smaller fourth wing attached below the main assembly, analogous to a sesquiplane.
|-
| Fokker V.8 || Germany || 5 planes || Fighter || 1917 || Prototype ||  || Tandem arrangement, grouped as a stacked triplane fore wing and a biplane rear wing.
|-
| Johns Multiplane || US || 7 planes || Experimental || 1919 || Prototype || 1 || Unable to maintain controlled flight.
|-
| Zerbe Air Sedan || US || 4 planes || Experimental || 1919 || Prototype || 1 || Crashed on first flight.
|-
| Caproni Ca.60 Noviplano || Italy || 9 planes || Transport || 1921 || Prototype || 1 || Three tandem stacks of triplane wings, nine in all. Flying boat.
|-
| Besson H-5 || France || 4 planes || Transport || 1922 || Prototype ||  || Flying boat with two braced biplane wing stacks deeply staggered and vertically offset such that the four wing planes were stacked in an overall zig-zag arrangement.
|-
| Gerhardt Cycleplane || US || 7 planes || Experimental || 1923 || Prototype || 1 || Stacked wings. Human-powered
|}

References

Notes

Bibliography
Angelucci, E. and Matricardi, P.; World Aircraft - Origins-World War 1, Sampson Low, 1977.
Green, W. and Swanborough, G.; The complete book of fighters, Salamander, 1994.
Jane, F.T.; All the world's aircraft 1913, Sampson Low, 1913, facsimile reprint David & Charles, 1969.

Wing configurations
 
Lists of aircraft by wing configuration